Aurélia Truel (born 4 April 1975) is a French ultramarathon runner, who specialises in trail running. She came second at the 2013 IAU Trail World Championships in Llanrwst, Wales, and was part of teams that won the 2011, 2013 and 2016 Trail World Championship team events.

Early life
Truel was born in Ivry-sur-Seine, France.
Aged 10, Truel started playing handball, and at the same time she started running, initially focusing on middle-distance running. She quit handball after deciding that she was too short to be competitive. Truel ran her first half-marathon in 1995 in Nogent-sur-Marne.

Career
Truel competed in her first trail event at the 2008  in the Grands Causses, France. In 2009, she came 21st overall and second female at the  event, and third female at the  event. In 2010, she came third at the Festival des Templiers. Truel was selected for the 2011 IAU Trail World Championships in Connemara, Ireland. She finished fourth in the individual event, and won the team event.

In 2012, Truel won the Festival des Templiers event. At the 2013 Trail World Championships in Llanrwst, Wales, Truel came second in the individual event, and retained her title in the team event. In the same year, she finished third at the Festival des Templiers event.

In 2016, Truel came 11th at the IAU Trail World Championships in Braga, Portugal, and won the team event again. It was her first participation at the event.

Publications
 Truel, Aurélia, Aubineau, Nicolas (2017) Trail: Coaching nutrition (in French) Fleurus

References

Trail runners
French female long-distance runners
1975 births
Living people
People from Ivry-sur-Seine
Sportspeople from Val-de-Marne